Gadam Kishan is an Indian actor, who has appeared in Tamil language films. He has acted in films including Deiva Thirumagal (2011) and Thirumanam Enum Nikkah (2014).

Career
Gadam Kishan began his career as a musician, performing the ghatam in fusion concerts, before going on to appear in the television serial Kana Kaanum Kaalangal. Gadam Kishan then went on to portray supporting roles as the lead actor's friend in Bale Pandiya (2010), as a mentally challenged person in Deiva Thirumagal (2011) and as Jai's brother in Thirumanam Enum Nikkah (2014). Before Balu Mahendra's death in early 2014, the director had planned a project starring Kishan in the leading role as a mentally challenged youngster. Despite conducting a photoshoot, the film maker's death meant that the film did not materialise. Kishan worked as a comedian in the film Ennodu Vilayadu (2017).

Filmography
 Films

 Television
Kana Kaanum Kaalangal
Sathya

References

External links 

 Gadam Kishan on IMDb

Living people
Tamil male television actors
Television personalities from Tamil Nadu
Male actors from Tamil Nadu
Male actors in Tamil cinema
21st-century Tamil male actors
Date of birth missing (living people)
Tamil comedians
Year of birth missing (living people)